Marco Moro (born 27 April 1984) is an Italian footballer who plays for FBC Saronno.

Career
Moro started his professional career at Venezia. After playing in the first match of the season, he was signed by Torino of Serie A on 31 August 2007, the last day of transfer windows. He was immediately farmed to Messina in a co-ownership deal. After the bankruptcy of Messina, he joined SPAL on loan. In July 2009, he went to Ascoli as part of the Luca Belingheri deal. He played once for Ascoli on 15 August at Coppa Italia. On 27 August, he was loaned to Spezia.

References

External links
Profile at Football.it 
Profile at La Gazzetta dello Sport (2007-08)) 

1984 births
Living people
Sportspeople from the Province of Treviso
Italian footballers
Venezia F.C. players
A.C.R. Messina players
S.P.A.L. players
Ascoli Calcio 1898 F.C. players
Serie B players
Association football forwards
Footballers from Veneto